Miguel Hilarión Eslava y Elizondo (21 October 1807 – 23 July 1878) was a Spanish composer and pedagogue.

Born in Burlada, Navarra, Eslava was co-founder of the society La España Musical with Emilio Arrieta, Francisco Asenjo Barbieri, and Joaquín Gaztambide to defend Spanish opera and zarzuela.

He died in Madrid aged 70.

References

External links
 A virtual portal to the music of Hilarión Eslava

1807 births
1878 deaths
19th-century classical composers
19th-century Spanish male musicians
Spanish classical composers
Spanish male classical composers
Spanish Romantic composers